Laqueus is a genus of brachiopods belonging to the family Laqueidae.

The species of this genus are found in Japan, Northern America.

Species

Species:

Laqueus astartaeformis 
Laqueus blanfordi 
Laqueus californicus

References

Brachiopod genera
Terebratulida